An alphabetical listing from list of British Columbia rivers, which is in order of watershed locations

A

	Adam River
	Adams River
	Akie River
	Alces River
	Alouette River
	Alsek River
	Anderson River
	Artlish River
	Ash River
	Asitka River
	Atleo River
	Atlin Lake
	Atnarko River
	Ayton Creek
	Azure River

B

	Bancroft Creek
	Barrière River
	Bear River
	Bear River
	Beatton River
	Beaver River
	Bedwell River
	Bella Coola River
	Benson River
	Besa River
	Birkenhead River
	Bishop River
	Black River
	Blanchard River
	Bloedel Creek
	Blue River
	Blueberry River
	Bonaparte River
	Bowron River
	Bowser Lake, Bowser River
	Bridge River
	Browns River
	Bulkley River
	Bull River
	Burman River

C

	Cadwallader Creek
	Cameron River
	Cameron River
	Campbell River (Semiahmoo Bay)
     Campbell River (Vancouver Island)
	Canoe River
Capilano River
	Cariboo River
	Carmanah Creek
	Castle Creek
	Caycuse River
	Cayoosh Creek
	Cervus Creek
	Cheakamus River
	Chehalis River
	Chemainus River
	Cheslatta River
	Chilanko River
	Chilcat River (sp. Chilkat in Alaska)
	Chilcotin River
	Chilko River
	China Creek
	Chipman Creek
	Chischa River
	Chowade River
	Chukachida River
	Churn Creek
	Chute Creek
	Clayoquot River
	Clearwater River
	Clore River
	Coal River
	Coldwater River (from Coquihalla Pass)
	Colquitz Creek
	Columbia River
	Comox Creek
	Conuma River
	Coquihalla River
	Coquitlam River
	Corrigan Creek
	Cottonwood
	Cous Creek
	Cowichan River
	Craig River
	Crooked River
	Cruickshank River
	Cypress River

D

	Dall River
	Darling River
	Davie River
	Deadman River
	Dean Channel
	Dean River
	Dease River
	Decker Lake
	Doig River
	Doré River
	Drinkwater Creek
	Dudidontu River
	Duncan River
	Dunedin River
	Dunsmuir Creek
	Duti River

E

	Eagle River (Dease River tributary)
       Eagle River (Shuswap Lake)
	East Klanawa River
	East Tutshi River
	Ecstall River
	Edmond River
	Effingham River
	Elaho River
	Elk River
	Elk River
	Endako River, Burns Lake
	Englishman River
	Entiako River
	Eve River
	Exchamsiks River

F

	Fantail River
	Finlay River
	Firesteel River
	Fisherman River
	Fitzsimmons Creek
	Flathead River
	Fleet River
	Flemer River
	Fontas River
	Fort Nelson River
	Fox River
	Franklin River
	Fraser River
	Frog River

G

	Gataga River
	Gates River
	Gitnadoix River
	Gladys River
	Goat River
	Gold River
	Goldstream River
	Goodspeed River
	Gordon River
	Gossen Creek
	Graham River
	Grayling River
	Green River
	Greenstone Creek
	Gun Creek
	Gundahoo River

H

	Hackett River
	Halfway River
	Harrison River
	Hayes River
	Heber River
	Hendon River
	Herrick Creek
	Hesquiat River
	Homan River
	Homathko River
	Horsefly River
	Houston River
	Hurley River

I

       Illecillewaet River
	Ingenika River
	Inhini River
	Inklin River
	Iron River
	Iskut River

J

       Jack Elliott Creek
	Jacklah River
	Jennings River
	Jordan River

K

	Kaouk River
	Kasiks River
	Katete River
	Kechika River
	Kedahda River
	Kehlechoa River
	Kelsall River
	Kemano River
	Kennedy River
	Keogh River
	Kettle River
	Kicking Horse River
	Kiskatinaw River
	Kispiox River
	Kitimat River
	Kitlope River
	Kitnayakwa River
	Kitsumkalum River, Kitsumkalum Lake
	Klanawa River
	Klappan River
	Klastline River
	Kleanza Creek
	Klehini River
	Klinaklini River
	Kluatantan River
	Kluayetz Creek
	Knight Inlet
	Koeye River
	Kokish River
	Koksilah River
	Kootenay River
	Kusawa River
	Kwadacha River
	Kwinitsa Creek
	Kwois Creek

L

Lakelse River
Leckie Creek
Leech River
Leiner River
Lillooet River
Lindeman Creek (from Chilkoot Pass)
Little Iskut River
Little Klappan River
Little Nitinat River
Little Oyster River
Little Qualicum River
Little Rancheria River
Little River (Cariboo River tributary)
Little River (Little Shuswap Lake)
Little River (Vancouver Island)
Little Tahltan River
Little Tuya River
Lord River
Loss Creek

M

	Machmell River
	MacJack River
	Mahood River
	Major Hart River
	Mamquam River
	Manson River
	Marble River
	Matthew River
	Maxan Lake
	McBride River
	McCook River
	McGregor River
	McLennan River
	McLeod River
	McNeil River
	Meager Creek
	Megin River
	Memkay River
	Mesilinka River
	Middle Memkay River
	Milk River
	Minaker River
	Mitchell River
	Moberly River
	Morice Lake
	Morice River
Mosquito Creek
	Mosque River
	Moyena River
	Muchalat River
	Murray River
	Murtle River
	Muskwa River
	Myra Creek

N

	Nabesche River
	Nahatlatch River
	Nahlin River
	Nahmint River
	Nahwitti River
	Nakina River
	Nakonake River
	Nanaimo River
	Narraway River
	Nass River
	Natalkuz Lake
	Nation River
	Nautley River
	Nechako River
	Nesook River
	Niagara Creek
	Nicola River
	Nicomekl River
	Nimpkish Lake
	Nimpkish River
	Ningunsaw River
	Nitinat River
	Noaxe Creek
	Nomash River
	North Kwadacha River
	North Memkay River
	North Nanaimo River
	North Thompson River
       Noyse Creek

O

	Obo River
	O'Donnel River
	Okanagan River
	Oktwanch River
	Omineca River
	Osborn River
	Osilinka River
	Ospika River
	Oyster River

P

	Pachena River
	Pack River
	Parsnip River
	Parton River
	Partridge River
	Pend d'Oreille River
	Perry River
	Petitot River
	Piggott Creek
	Pike River
	Pine River
	Pitman River
	Pitt River
	Pouce Coupe River
	Powell River
	Primrose River
	Prophet River
	Puntledge River

Q

	Qualicum River
       Quartz Creek
	Quatsie River
	Quesnel River
	Quinsam River

R

	Rabbit River
	Racine Creek
	Racing River
	Raging River
	Ralph River
	Range Creek
	Rapid River
	Raush River
	Red River
	Redwillow River (Smoky River, Alberta drainage)
	Relay Creek
	River of Golden Dreams
	Roaring River
	Robertson River
	Robson River
	Ross River
	Rutherford Creek
	Ryan River

S

	Sahtaneh River
	Salmon River
	Salmon River
	Samotua River
	San Jose River
	San Josef River
	San Juan River
	Sand River
	Sarita River
	Saunders Creek
	Schipa River
  Serpentine river
	Seton Creek
	Seymour River
	Shawnigan River
	Sheemahant River
	Shegunia River
	Shepherd Creek
	Sheslay River
	Shushartie River
	Shuswap River
	Sicintine River
	Sikanni Chief River
	Silver Salmon River
	Similkameen River
	Sittakanay River (confluence with the Taku is in Alaska)
	Skagit River
	Skeena River
	Slim Creek
	Sloko River
	Smith River
	Snake River
	Somass River
       Sombrio River
	Soo River
	Sooke Lake
	Sooke River
	South Englishman River
	South Nanaimo River
	South Sarita River
	South Thompson River
	South Whiting River
	Southgate River
	Spatsizi River
	Spillimacheen River
	Sproat River
	Squamish River
	Squinguila River
   St. Mary's River
	Stamp River
	Stave River
	Stein River
	Stellako River
	Stikine River
	Stranby River
	Stuart River
	Stuhini Creek
	Sturdee River
	Sucowa River
	Sukunwa River
	Surprise Creek
	Sustut River
	Sutlahine River
	Swannell River
	Swanson River
	Swift River
	Swift River
	Sydney River

T

	Tahini River (NB different from Takhini River, which is in same area and rains the other way)
	Tahltan River
	Tahsis River
	Tahsish River
	Tahtsa Reach, Tahtsa Lake
	Takhini River
	Taku River
	Talbot Creek
	Tanzilla River
	Taseko River
	Tats Creek
	Tatsatua Creek
	Tatshenshini River
	Taylor River
	Tchaikazan River
	Teihsum River
	Telkwa River
	Teslin River
	Tetachuck Lake
	Tetsa River
	Thelwood Creek
	Thompson River
	Tkope Creek
	Tlupana River
	Toad River
	Toba Inlet
	Toba River
	Toboggan Creek
	Tofino Creek
	Toodoggone River
	Toquart River
	Torpy River
	Torres Channel
	Trent River
	Trout Creek?
	Trout River
	Tsable River
	Tsitika River
	Tsolum River
	Tsuiquate River
	Tuchodi River
	Tulsequah River
	Turnagain River
	Tutshi River (from White Pass)
	Tuya River
	Tyaughton Creek

U

	Ucana River
	Unuk River
	Upana River
	Ursus Creek

V

	Vedder River (aka Chilliwack River)
	Vents River

W

	Walbran Creek
	Wannock River
	Wap Creek
	Wapiti River (Smoky River, Alberta drainage)
	Warneford River
	Watt Creek
	Waukwaas River
	West Kiskatinaw River
	West Road or Blackwater River
	West Toad River
	White River
	Whiting River
	Wicked River
	Willow River
	Wolf River
	Wolverine River
	Wolverine River
	Woss Creek

X-Y
	Yahk River
	Yalakom River
	Yeth Creek

Z
	Zeballos River
	Zohini Creek
	Zymoetz River

See also
List of British Columbia rivers

British Columbia
 
Rivers